Andrzej Hachuła (born August 6, 1960) is a former Polish ice hockey player.

Hachuła played for the Poland men's national ice hockey team at the 1984 Winter Olympics in Sarajevo.

References 

1960 births
Living people
Polish ice hockey centres
Ice hockey players at the 1984 Winter Olympics
Olympic ice hockey players of Poland
Sportspeople from Katowice
20th-century Polish people